Georgetown is an unincorporated community at the junction of Bradley, Hamilton, and Meigs counties, Tennessee. The community is located along State Route 60 near its intersection with State Route 58.

The Bradley County portion of Georgetown is part of the Cleveland, TN Metropolitan Statistical Area, while the Hamilton County portion is part of the Chattanooga, TN–GA Metropolitan Statistical Area.

Georgetown is the place name associated with U.S. Postal Service zip code 37336. The Zip Code Tabulation Area for that zip code had a population of 5,337, according to the 2020 U.S. Census.

History 
Georgetown is located along Tennessee State Route 60, along what was part of the main Northern Route of the Trail of Tears in 1838. According to tradition, the village was named for Cherokee trader, George Fields, who owned a two-story log home and operated a trading post at the intersection of now Georgetown Road and Francisco Road in the early 1800s. "An affluent merchant who operated a flatboat on the Hiwassee and Tennessee Rivers, he was also a slave owner and leader in tribal politics. His two-story log dwelling, known as the George House, bears the date of 1812." The "George House" burned and was dismantled in 2014. It is believed that George Fields was buried just east of where his home once stood.

In the late 1800s Georgetown was an active trading center featuring several gristmills, tanneries, and sawmills. Goods arrived in nearby Cleveland via the Tennessee, Virginia, and Georgia Railroad and were transported by wagon to the village. Several of the main items produced for market during this time were corn, wheat and bacon.

Georgetown's first post office was established as "Limestone" in March 9, 1837 and was changed to "Georgetown" in 1867. It  has since been located in four different counties, including James County, "The Lost County of Tennessee", which dissolved in 1919. It currently operates in Meigs County.

Properties on the National Register of Historic Places located in Georgetown:

Education 
The Georgetown Academy, founded in 1847 by the Cumberland Presbyterian Church, is the earliest school of record in Georgetown. Located about a quarter mile southwest from the intersection of TN SR 60 and Ooltewah-Georgetown Road, it is believed to have been operated until around the time of the Civil War. The second floor of the school was the location of the Limestone Lodge No. 176 F. & A.M. chartered in 1849.

Notable people
Greg Vital - American conservationist, businessman, and District 29 Tennessee State Representative. 
Wilburn Cartwright – lawyer, educator, U.S. Representative from Oklahoma, and United States Army officer in World War II was born here.

References

Unincorporated communities in Tennessee
Unincorporated communities in Meigs County, Tennessee
Unincorporated communities in Bradley County, Tennessee
Unincorporated communities in Hamilton County, Tennessee
Cleveland metropolitan area, Tennessee

Chattanooga metropolitan area